is a song recorded by Japanese singer Maaya Sakamoto, from the album Follow Me Up. It was released as a double A-side single alongside the song "Shikisai" by FlyingDog on January 28, 2015. The song was composed by Rasmus Faber, who also produced the track. The lyrics were written by Yuho Iwasato, marking the first collaboration between Sakamoto and Iwasato in four years, since "More Than Words". "Shiawase ni Tsuite Watashi ga Shitte Iru Itsutsu no Hōhō" is the opening theme to the TBS anime series Gourmet Girl Graffiti.

Chart performance
"Shiawase ni Tsuite Watashi ga Shitte Iru Itsutsu no Hōhō" debuted on the Oricon Singles Chart at number 9, with 10,000 copies sold in first charting week. The single charted on the chart for sixteen weeks, selling a reported total of 17,000 copies sold.

Track listing

Credits and personnel
Personnel

 Vocals, backing vocals – Maaya Sakamoto
 Songwriting – Yuho Iwasato, Rasmus Faber
 Production, arrangement, mixing, mastering, programming, electronic keyboard – Rasmus Faber
 Bass – Mad Midget
 Guitar – Jimmy Wahlsteen
 Strings – Claudia Bonfiglioli
 Engineering – Rasmus Faber, Takahiro Okubo

Charts

References

2015 songs
2015 singles
Anime songs
Maaya Sakamoto songs
Songs with lyrics by Yuho Iwasato
FlyingDog singles